The Algeria national football team represents Algeria in men's international football and is governed by the Algerian Football Federation. The team plays their home matches at the 5 July Stadium in Algiers and Miloud Hadefi Stadium in Oran. Algeria joined FIFA on 1 January 1964, a year and a half after gaining independence. They are the current champions of the FIFA Arab Cup.

The North African team has qualified for four World Cups in 1982, 1986, 2010 and 2014. Algeria has won the Africa Cup of Nations twice, once in 1990, when they hosted the tournament, and again in Egypt in 2019 and they also won the 2021 FIFA Arab Cup. They were also champions of the 1991 Afro-Asian Cup of Nations, the men's football tournament of the 1978 All-Africa Games and the men's football tournament of the 1975 Mediterranean Games.

The traditional rivals of Algeria are mainly Morocco, Tunisia and Egypt. Algeria has also had very competitive matches against Nigeria, especially in the 1980s during Algeria's best football generation, against Mali due to sharing a common border and a long-standing competitive rivalry, and against Senegal, where Algeria's first global success began. For the Algerians, their biggest victory was their 2–1 win against West Germany during the 1982 FIFA World Cup in which the African nation shocked the world. Algeria has produced many talented players throughout time and is considered one of the best teams in African football history. At the 2014 World Cup in Brazil, Algeria became the first African team to score at least four goals in a match at a World Cup, which was against South Korea.

History

The ALN football team, 1957–1958
On 1956, in Tunis, Tunisia, was formed the first team to represent Algeria, the Armée de Libération Nationale (ALN) team by Ahmed Benelfoul and Habib Draoua. The team was approved by the FLN on May 1957 and was managed by Salah Saidou and the player Abdelkader Zerrar was the captain. The first game was played on 1 June 1957 against Tunisia in the Stade Chedly Zouiten. On April 1958, the team was dissolved and was replaced by the FLN team.

The FLN football team, 1958–1962
The FLN football team was a team made up mainly of professional players in France, who then joined the Algerian independence movement of the National Liberation Front (FLN), and assisted in organizing football matches against national football teams. The FLN linked African football to anti-colonial resistance using the idea of Pan-Africanism as a legitimizing tool and symbol of national identity. The French authorities easily obtained the non-recognition of the team by FIFA.

The Beginning, 1962
Football in Algeria was established in the 1830s by European settlers bringing the sport to the country. The Algerian football team was established in 1962 after gaining independence from France, as the successor of the FLN football team. Under French rule, Algeria was not allowed to have a national team, the FLN football team was sort of a rebellion against the French colonization. All of their games were considered friendlies and were unrecognized by FIFA. During a press conference in Tunis, the Algerian football team refused to make any political statements, referring to football as a sport rather than a political influence.  After the Algerian national football team was officially recognized by FIFA in 1963, the team only qualified to the 1968 Africa Cup of Nations and failed to qualify for the next five editions of the African cup until 1980.

The best XI , 1980–1990

1982 FIFA World Cup

Algeria caused one of the great World Cup upsets on the first day of the tournament with a 2–1 victory over current European champions West Germany. In the final match in the group between West Germany and Austria, with Algeria and Chile having already played their final group game the day before, the European teams knew that a West German win by 1 or 2 goals would qualify them both, while a larger West German victory would qualify Algeria over Austria, and a draw or an Austrian win would eliminate the West Germans. After 10 minutes of all-out attack, West Germany scored through a goal by Horst Hrubesch. After the goal was scored, the two teams kicked the ball around aimlessly for the rest of the match. Chants of "Fuera, fuera" ("Out, out") were screamed by the Spanish crowd, while angry Algerian supporters waved banknotes at the players. This performance was widely deplored, even by the West German and Austrian fans. Algeria protested to FIFA, who ruled that the result be allowed to stand; FIFA introduced a revised qualification system at subsequent World Cups in which the final two games in each group were played simultaneously.

1986 FIFA World Cup

In 1984, Algeria took third place in the 1984 Africa Cup of Nations in Ivory Coast. During the 1986 Africa Cup of Nations, the national teams recorded two defeats and one draw and was eliminated in the first round. In Mexico, at the 1986 World Cup, the Algerians were not able to pass the first round once again in a group that included Northern Ireland (1–1 draw), Brazil (1–0 loss), and Spain (3–0 loss). Only one Algerian scored during this competition: Djamel Zidane. From thereon, Algeria failed to qualify for another World Cup until 2010.

1990 African Cup of Nations

In 1990, Algeria hosted the 1990 Africa Cup of Nations for the first time and were strongly considered to win the competition. drawn In Group A, the Algerians started the tournament by beating Nigeria 5–1, with doubles by Djamel Menad and Rabah Madjer and a goal by Djamel Amani. After a great start with a convincing victory against the Nigerians, they then beat Ivory Coast 3–0, with goals by Djamel Menad, Tahar Chérif El-Ouazzani, and Chérif Oudjani. The last game of the group, Algeria beat Egypt 2–0, with goals by Djamel Amani and Moussa Saïb. After a perfect start with three wins in as many games, Algeria beat Senegal 2–1 in the semi finals after Djamel Menad and Djamel Amani scored in front of 85,000 fans in the Stade du 5 Juillet to reach the final for the second time in history. In the final against Nigeria, in front of 105,302 fans in the same stadium, Chérif Oudjani, in the 38th minute, enabled Algeria to win the African Cup of Nations for the first time. Djamel Menad was crowned top scorer of the competition with four goals.

The dark years, 1992–2008

After winning the 1990 African Cup of Nations and barely missing out in qualifying to the 1990 World Cup, Algerian football was still at its peak. However, with Algeria being on the brink of a civil war in the early 90s, social and political unrest started having a negative impact in every domain in the country including football. Although Algeria qualified to the 1992 African Cup of Nations, the title holders were disappointing and were eliminated in the first round of the competition.

In the 1994 African Cup of Nations Algeria was disqualified from the tournament after fielding an ineligible player, and many fans back home strongly criticized the staff of the team, accusing them of being irresponsible and unprofessional. In 1996, Algeria returned to African Cup of Nations, but were eliminated by hosts South Africa in the quarter-finals. The Algerians failed to qualify for the following World Cups in 1998, 2002 and 2006. During the 1998 African Cup of Nations, Algeria finished last in its group with three defeats and was eliminated in the group stage. Algerian football was losing its reputation and the team that was once considered one of the best teams in Africa, was no longer feared.

In the 2000 African Cup of Nations, the Fennecs passed the first round only to lose to 2–1 to eventual champions Cameroon in the quarter-finals. Algeria once more failed to pass the first round in the African competition in 2002. but in the 2004, Algeria, coached by Rabah Saadane were looking good and full of confidence, After drawing the first game of the group 1–1 against tournament favorites Cameroon, Algeria recorded a historic win against archrivals Egypt 2–1. After a good start by Algeria, the north African side surprisingly lost the last game of the group against Zimbabwe 2–1 However, because of the 2–1 victory against Egypt, Algeria finished second in their group and advanced to the next round. Their next opponent was Morocco and after a goalless game for over 80 minutes,  Algeria took the lead in the 84th minute after a goal from Abdelmalek Cherrad, nearly seconds before the final whistle Morocco scored which meant the two sides would have to play in extra time, where Morocco would go on to win 3–1. The loss against their North African neighbors was heartbreaking, and after that game, Algeria failed to qualify for the following two Africa Cup of Nations in 2006 and 2008 and nothing seemed to be working for Algerian football.

The return

2010 World Cup qualifiers

On 11 October 2008, Algeria returned to the top 20 African teams in the Fifa ranking by finishing first in their group ahead of Senegal, Gambia, and Liberia for the second round In the combined 2010 World Cup and 2010 African Cup of Nations qualifications. In the third and final round of the qualifiers, Algeria was joined by Zambia, Rwanda, and Egypt in group C. Egypt was widely considered the favorites to win the group and qualify for the World Cup. However, in June 2009, Algeria beat the double African champions Egypt 3–1 which ultimately changed the teams objectives from just qualifying for the African Cup of Nations, to qualifying for the World Cup after a 24-year absence. The next game was against Zambia where the Desert Foxes won 2–0 in Lusaka. Algeria then again beat Zambia at home in Blida 1–0 followed by a 3–1 win against Rwanda, the Algerians ensured that the qualification for the World Cup would go down to the wire with a final encounter against Egypt in Cairo, where only a loss by three goals would stop the Fennecs from going to South Africa. Prior to the game, the Algerian team bus was attacked in Cairo by Egyptian fans, leaving several team members injured. This led to a diplomatic row between the two countries. The attack prior to the game left the Algerian players in shock which resulted in a 2–0 loss in a controversial situation, conceding a goal just within a couple seconds from the final whistle. The loss would mean that the two north African sides would have a to play a playoff game in Sudan with the winner qualifying to the world cup in South Africa. Algeria won 1–0 after a stunning goal from Anthar Yahia and qualified for the World Cup for the third time in their history.

2010 Africa Cup of Nations

After qualifying to the 2010 world cup at the expense of Egypt, Algeria was gaining back the respect that they lost in the early 90s. So they came in the 2010 tournament full of confidence. Being drawn in Group A, with Angola, Malawi, and Mali, Algeria started poorly, surprisingly losing 3–0 to group outsiders Malawi. After that loss Algeria had to prove that the first game was only a mistake and in the following game against Mali they won 1–0 thanks to a Rafik Halliche header. In the last match, they drew 0–0 with Angola, which sent them to the second round, finishing with the same number of points as Mali, but with a superior head-to-head record. Playing in Cabinda, Algeria faced Ivory Coast in the quarterfinals who were considered heavy favorites. After trailing 1–0, Karim Matmour equalized in the first half, the Algerians were having a great game but as the game was heading into extra time Keita gave the Ivorians the lead in the 89th minute, a goal which seemed sure to seal their victory. However, the Algerians equalized with Madjid Bougherra just 2 minutes later in added time, and in extra time a perfect Karim Ziani cross found Hameur Bouazza who gave the Fennecs the lead.
Algeria shocked the whole continent with a convincing win against a Cote Ivoire team that was considered the best in Africa. Next Algeria faced Egypt in the semi-finals, tensions were still high between the two nations after the World Cup qualification play-off incident and fans from both sides felt it was a must win game for them. Unfortunately for Algeria, things did not go as planned. After waves of controversial decisions from the referee for both sides, Algeria ended the game with 3 red cards which led to Egypt winning 4–0 which was the biggest defeat in the history of the teams' meetings. Algeria then lost 1–0 to Nigeria in the third-place game and finished fourth in the competition.

2010 FIFA World Cup

Algeria was drawn in Group C with England, USA, Slovenia. The north African side came in the tournament in poor form, losing nearly all their world cup preparation games in friendlies. In their first game they lost to Slovenia 0–1. The match was scoreless until Slovenia's captain Robert Koren scored in the 79th minute after Abdelkader Ghezzal was sent off for his second bookable offence. In their second group game, Algeria drew with England leading to mass celebration throughout the world's Algerian communities. The Fennecs lost their final group game to the United States 1–0 thanks to a Landon Donovan winner in second-half injury time.  Algeria exited the championship as one of two teams, along with Honduras, to fail to score a goal.

2010–11: A team in trouble
After the World Cup, bad results were growing and growing with no wins. After a 2–1 home loss to Guinea in a friendly match and a 1–1 draw at home to Tanzania, veteran manager
Rabah Saâdane resigned and was replaced with Abdelhak Benchikha. The newly appointed coach tried to bring in new faces to the squad to bolster their offense but poor results continued for Benchikha's side who started off with a 2–0 away loss to Central African Republic. There was a little bit of hope restored for the Algerians after they beat Morocco 1–0 at home after a goal from Hassan Yebda but After they lost 4–0 to Morocco in the return leg, their manager resigned. Algeria failed to qualify for the 2012 Africa Cup of Nations and the nightmare continued.

2011–12: The arrival of Halilhodžić

After new coach Vahid Halilhodžić was appointed, he got a few decent results before the start of the World cup qualifiers. The Bosnian coach's debut resulted in a 1–1 away draw against Tanzania, they then beat Central African Republic 2–0 with goals coming from Hassan Yebda and Foued Kadir. After a good game against Tanzania and a convincing win against The Central African Rep, the Algerian fans started to believe in their national team again and put all their trust in coach Vahid to revive the national team, and that is exactly what happened as the good results kept on coming, Algeria then beat Niger 3–0 in a friendly, and with the start of the 2014 Fifa World Cup qualifiers Algeria beat Rwanda 4–0 to start off brightly. Qualifying for The 2013 African cup of Nations was the next target for Les Fennecs and they started off with beating Gambia 2–1 in Banjul followed by a 4–1 victory in Blida to advance to the final qualifying round, where the Algerians would take on north African neighbors Libya. The desert warriors ended up winning 3–0 on aggregate against the Libyans to qualify for the 2013 Africa Cup of Nations.

2013 Africa Cup of Nations: Disappointing results
Algeria arrived to the 2013 Africa Cup of Nations with plenty of confidence and with the emergence of Islam Slimani and El Arbi Hillel Soudani, as well as the addition to the squad of talented Valencia CF winger Sofiane Feghouli, Algeria was even considered one of the favorites to win the competition, but unfortunately for them they lacked experience and despite clear domination against their opponents, they finished last in their group after losing the first game against Tunisia 1–0 after a crucial 90'minute goal from Youssef Msakni. In their second game against Togo, Algeria was widely expected to come out with a victory but again the lack of experience was once again crucial, after dominating the game, they conceded two goals and were officially eliminated from the competition. The last game against Ivory Coast ended in a 2–2 draw. The Algerian fans were extremely disappointed with their team's early exit from the competition, and the Algerian media even speculated coach Vahid would be sacked, but the president of the Algerian Football Federation decided to maintain Vahid.

Road to Brazil 2014
After a disappointing campaign in the 2013 Africa Cup of Nations, and the Algerian Football Federation confirming their manager's stay. Algeria would then focus on their World cup qualifying campaign which they had a decent start to with one win and one loss, They continued their campaign winning 3–1 versus Benin at home and beating them again 3–1 away in Benin. After travelling to Kigali to face Rwanda, a 1–0 away victory guaranteed them the first-place position in their group which means they would advance to the final round of the qualifying campaign. Their last game didn't have any effect on the standings but Algeria still won 1–0 versus Mali national football team. After topping group H, Algeria was drawn with Burkina Faso as their final opponent. The 1st leg was held in Burkina Faso and the second was in Algeria. The first leg ended in a highly-competitive 3–2 loss to Burkina Faso. The second leg was also a tightly contested, competitive match with Algeria managing a 1–0 victory to advance to the 2014 World Cup.

Making history, 2014 FIFA World Cup

Algeria were drawn in Group H with World Cup favorites Belgium, Russia, and South Korea. In their opening game against Belgium, Sofiane Feghouli scored Algeria's first World Cup goal for 28 years giving his team the lead 1–0. Eventually, Belgium caught up and scored two goals to give themselves a 2–1 victory. In their second game against South Korea, the Algerians needed a strong win to have a good chance of going to the next round. They won 4–2, with Yacine Brahimi scored the fourth goal against the opposition to set a record of being the first African team to score four or more goals in a single match in the World Cup. On 26 June, Algeria played Russia for second place in Group H. Russia scored the opening goal but Islam Slimani became a hero by scoring the equalizer to carry Algeria to the second round of the World Cup for the first time. In the second round, Algeria was able to hold eventual champions Germany to a goalless draw for 90 minutes. In extra-time the Germans scored twice while Algeria scored a lone goal from Abdelmoumene Djabou. The match that ended in elimination for the Algerian team.

Decline (2015–2018)
After coach Vahid decided to opt out of a contract extension following their World Cup, Lorient coach Christian Gourcuff was appointed by FAF president Mohamed Raouraoua to help Algeria reach its goals.

2015 Africa Cup of Nations

After topping their 2015 Africa Cup of Nations qualification group which consisted of Mali, Malawi, and Ethiopia, Algeria were heavy favorites to win the 2015 edition of the tournament hosted in Equatorial Guinea. Algeria were drawn in a very group that included South Africa, Ghana, and Senegal. Algeria struggled in the first game against the South Africans and were a goal down before finally beating them 3–1. In the second game against Ghana, the Black Stars were in desperate need of a victory after losing the first game to Senegal, after 90 minutes, and while the game looked like it was heading to a goalless draw with neither side looking dangerous, Asamoah Gyan struck before the final whistle to give a 1–0 victory to Ghana. In the last game of the group against Senegal, Algeria looked better and after goals from Riyad Mahrez and youngster Nabil Bentaleb the Foxes were through to the next round. The Desert Foxes finished second in their group behind Ghana despite their goal difference due to their head-to-head record. Ivory Coast awaited them, where Wilfried Bony would score twice for an eventual 2–1 win for the Elephants, eliminating the Desert Foxes from the competition.

2017–2018: Africa Cup of Nations and World Cup qualification

Manager Christian Gourcuff was widely criticized after the African Cup exit, he continued being criticized for his tactics and results, losing 2–1 in a friendly against Guinea and drawing 2–2 Against Tanzania. Although Algeria would achieve wins at home, such as the 7–0 return leg win against Tanzania the team was very fragile on away games and conceded too many goals. The Tanzania win allowed them to reach the Final round of the 2018 World Cup qualifiers. Algeria were drawn in a group with Nigeria, Cameroon and Zambia with only the team finishing top of the group qualifying to the 2018 FIFA World Cup.

After a 3–3 away draw against Ethiopia, Manager Christian Gourcuff resigned from his position. Milovan Rajevac was then appointed manager in June 2016, but resigned 4 months later after Algeria's first World cup qualifying game ended in a home draw against Cameroon. The Algerian Football federation then hired Georges Leekens who did no better than his predecessor by losing to Nigeria 3-1 during match day 2 of the World cup Qualifiers in November 2016.

Leekens then coached Algeria during the 2017 Africa Cup of Nations where the desert foxes had a horrible campaign drawing against Zimbabwe and Senegal and losing against Tunisia which resulted in an early group stage elimination. The African nation was on a steady decline and once again Algeria would get a new coach after Leekens resigned right after the African Cup and FAF president Raouraoua also left his position and was replaced by Kheiredine Zetchi. The new president came with new ideas, he brought in Spanish coach Lucas Alcaraz to try to kick start the national team once again, however the Spaniard was sacked after poor results which meant Algeria would miss the 2018 Fifa World cup. Missing the World cup was a huge upset in the country.

In November 2017, Former Algerian Superstar Rabah Madjer was appointed as manager, the decision to bring in Madjer was a controversial one as he hadn't coached any team for over 10 years and did have a past failed coaching experience with Algeria. Madjer wouldn't last very long either, after a couple of bad results in friendly matches including a 3–0 loss against Portugal, he would also be sacked after only 7 months in charge. Within four years of the end of the 2014 World cup, Algeria had five different coaches with the performances and results only getting worse.

2019–present: Hope & coach Belmadi

After a series of errors from the Algerian Football Federation with repeated under performing coaches, the federation appointed former Algerian international Djamel Belmadi on 2 August 2018. Belmadi was a young coach and had mainly previously coached in Qatar. However, due to his unsuccessful tenure with the Qatar national team, when they were eliminated early in the 2015 AFC Asian Cup, skepticism arose about the manager. Algeria's performance in the 2019 AFCON qualification, while acceptable, also suffered setback, such as a shocking 0–1 away loss to Benin and two 1–1 draws to less known Gambia, raising big concerns over Algeria in the 2019 Africa Cup of Nations. Thus, Algeria was not expected to contend for the trophy, but was nonetheless expected to proceed at least to the quarter finals. In spite of criticisms of Belmadi, Algeria topped group C won all three matches including a 1–0 victory over 2018 FIFA World Cup's participant Senegal. Algeria's solid performance continued with a 3–0 win over Guinea in the round of sixteen; before they overcame Ivory Coast in a hard-fought encounter which they won in a penalty shootout 4–3, after having drawn 1–1 after 120 minutes. The Algerians then went on to defeat Nigeria 2–1 with a dying minute's free kick shot by Riyad Mahrez. Facing Senegal once again in the final, Baghdad Bounedjah scored the only goal of the game as Algeria won 1–0, earning them their second title since 1990. This made Algeria the second North African side after Egypt to win more than one AFCON trophy.

To continue off the high of the African Cup win, Algeria competed in the 2021 FIFA Arab Cup which was held in Qatar. As the tournament did not occur during the international break, Belmadi was unable to coach and national team veteran and assistant coach Madjid Bougherra filled in. Algeria managed to stay undefeated through the group stages. Their first match ended in a 4–0 win over Sudan with goals from Bounedjah, Benlamri, and Soudani. The second match against Lebanon ended in a 2–0 win with goals from Brahimi and Meziani. The last match for the top of Group D ended in a tie against Egypt, putting Egypt at the top of the group due to their fewer fouls throughout the tournament. This brought them to the knockout stages where they started with a match against Morocco. Brahimi scored off a penalty that was immediately equalized by Morocco's Nahiri. After Belaili scored in overtime and Morocco equalized again, the game went onto a penalty shootout that ended in a 5–3 win for Algeria, moving them to the semifinals against the host country, Qatar. Benlamri took the lead in the 59th minute but when the unnecessary 5 minutes of stoppage time extended to 7 minutes for Qatar to score off a corner, the game appeared to be heading into overtime. However, the referee kept the match going when Qatar regained possession beyond reason which backfired when Algeria made a counterattack that ultimately led to a free kick scored by Belaili at 90+17', with the game concluding at a record 90+19'. The Arab Cup final against their neighbor and rival Tunisia ended regular time in a scoreless draw. In overtime, Algeria took the lead with a goal by Sayoud in the 99th minute. The match ended with Tunisia attempting to equalize on a corner and go into a penalty shootout. However, Tunisia missed the chance when Algeria gained possession for a counterattack by Brahimi to conclude the match with a goal at 120+5' and winning the team another trophy.

AFCON 2022 came off to a rough start. Their first match against Sierra Leone ended in a scoreless draw for 1 point each. Their second match ended in their first loss since 2019 against Equatorial Guinea, losing 0–1, ending their 35-game unbeaten streak, 2 games away from the record held by Italy. The Algeria team suffered a defeat to Ivory Coast which led to their early exit at the group stages of the AFCON 2021.

Home stadium

The Algerian National Football Team play traditionally in the 5 July Stadium in Algiers. However the team have played their home games at the Mustapha Tchaker Stadium in Blida from 2009 to 2022. Now, the Miloud Hadefi Stadium in Oran which was inaugurated on 2021 had becomed the home venue of the team. Also other new stadiums being built in Algeria, one of which is expected to be also the home venue for the team, the forty thousand capacity Baraki Stadium being built in Algiers. Another Stadium currently under construction, where the National team is expected to play some of its scheduled friendly games is in the New Stadium of Tizi Ouzou.

Team image

The Algeria national team home kit is all white with green trim, and the away kit is all green with white trim.

Kit sponsorship

Results and fixtures

The following is a list of match results in the last 12 months, as well as any future matches that have been scheduled.

2022

2023

Coaching staff

Players

Current squad
 The following players were called up for the 2023 Africa Cup of Nations qualification matches against .
 Match dates: 23 and 27 March 2023
 Opposition: 
 Caps and goals correct as of: 19 November 2022, after the match against

Recent call-ups
The following players have been called up to the Algeria squad at least once within the last 12 months.

Notes
INJ = Player withdrew from the squad due to an injury.
RET = Retired from international football.
WD = Player withdrew from the roster for non-injury related reasons.
COV = Player withdrew from the roster due to COVID-19.

Records

Players in bold are still active with Algeria.

Most appearances

Top goalscorers

Competitive record

FIFA World Cup

Olympic Games

Africa Cup of Nations

African Games

Mediterranean Games

FIFA Arab Cup

 Algeria participated with the national University team
 Algeria participated with the national U-23 team
 Algeria participated with the national A' team (local players) in addition to players from other Arab leagues

Pan Arab Games

 Algeria participated with the B team

Other records

All-time record against FIFA recognized nations

Below is a record of all matches correct as of 20 Nov 2022 after match against 

(a) Denotes defunct national football team.
(b) Includes games against USSR.
(c) Includes games against Yugoslavia.

Honours

Official titles 

International

FIFA World Cup
Round of 16 (1): 2014
Football at the Summer Olympics
 Quarter-finals (1): 1980
 Mediterranean Games
Champions (1): 1975
Runners-up (1): 1993
Third place (1): 1979
 Afro-Asian Cup of Nations
Champions (1): 1991

Continental
Africa Cup of Nations
Champions (2): 1990, 2019
Runners-up (1): 1980
Third place (2): 1984, 1988
Fourth place (2): 1982, 2010
African Nations Championship
Runners-up (1): 2022
Fourth place (1): 2011
 African Games
Champions (1): 1978

Other titles 

Regional title

FIFA Arab Cup
Champions (1):  2021
 Pan Arab Games
Third place (1): 1985
 Palestine Cup of Nations
Third place (2): 1972, 1973
 Islamic Solidarity Games
Third place (1): 2017

Total titles

Awards 
 African National Team of the Year
Winners (8): 1980,  1981, 1982, 1990 (shared), 1991, 2009, 2014, 2019

See also
Algeria A' national football team
Algeria national under-23 football team
Algeria national under-20 football team
Algeria national under-17 football team
List of Algeria national football team managers
List of Algeria international footballers
Algeria national football team records and statistics
List of leading goalscorers for the Algeria national football team
Algeria national football team all-time record

Notes
A.Prior to Algerian independence in 1962, matches were organised under the auspices of the Front de Libération Nationale and it's called the FLN football team.

References

External links

Algerian FA
Algeria FIFA profile
The Algerian Football Notebooks
 ELKHADRA
National Football Teams

 
African national association football teams
1963 establishments in Algeria
A